Atli Gíslason (born 12 August 1947) is a member of parliament of the Althing, the Icelandic parliament. He was elected as a member of the Left-Green Movement, but is now a non-party member. He is a co-founder of the new Rainbow political party, and stood for election in the 2013 parliamentary election as a member of that party.

External links
Althing biography

Living people
1947 births
Atli Gislason
Atli Gislason
Atli Gislason